Oleria is a genus of clearwing (ithomiine) butterflies, named by Jacob Hübner in 1816. They are in the brush-footed butterfly family, Nymphalidae.

Species

Arranged alphabetically within species groups:
Oleria aegle (Fabricius, 1776)
Oleria agarista (C. Felder & R. Felder, 1862)
Oleria alexina (Hewitson, [1859])
Oleria amalda (Hewitson, [1857])
Oleria antaxis (Haensch, 1909)
Oleria aquata (Weymer, 1875)
Oleria assimilis (Haensch, 1903)
Oleria astrea (Cramer, [1775])
Oleria athalina (Staudinger, [1884])
Oleria attalia (Hewitson, 1855)
Oleria bioculata (Haensch, 1905)
Oleria canilla (Hewitson, 1874)
Oleria cyrene (Latreille, [1809])
Oleria deronda (Hewitson, 1876)
Oleria derondina (Haensch, 1909)
Oleria enania (Haensch, 1909)
Oleria estella (Hewitson, 1868)
Oleria fasciata (Haensch, 1903)
Oleria flora (Cramer, 1779)
Oleria fumata (Haensch, 1905)
Oleria gunilla (Hewitson, 1858)
Oleria ilerdina (Hewitson, [1858])
Oleria ilerdinoides (Staudinger, 1885)
Oleria makrena (Hewitson, [1854])
Oleria olerioides (d'Almeida, 1952)
Oleria onega (Hewitson, [1852])
Oleria padilla (Hewitson, 1863)
Oleria paula (Weymer, 1883)
Oleria phenomoe (Doubleday, [1847])
Oleria quadrata (Haensch, 1903)
Oleria quintina (C. Felder & R. Felder, 1865)
Oleria radina (Haensch, 1909)
Oleria rubescens (Butler & H. Druce, 1872)
Oleria santineza (Haensch, 1903)
Oleria sexmaculata (Haensch, 1903)
Oleria similigena d'Almeida, 1962
Oleria synnova (Hewitson, [1859])
Oleria tigilla (Weymer, 1899)
Oleria tremona (Haensch, 1909)
Oleria vicina (Salvin, 1869)
Oleria victorine (Guérin-Méneville, [1844])
Oleria zea (Hewitson, [1855])
Oleria zelica (Hewitson, 1856)
The Ollantaya species group:
Oleria aegineta (Hewitson, 1869)
Oleria baizana (Haensch, 1903)

References

Ithomiini
Nymphalidae of South America
Nymphalidae genera
Taxa named by Jacob Hübner